Knox Dale is an unincorporated community in Jefferson County, Pennsylvania, United States. Knox Dale has a post office with ZIP code 15847.

History
Knox Dale was originally called Shadagee, and under the latter name was platted in 1851. A post office has been in operation under the name Knox Dale since 1863.

References

Unincorporated communities in Jefferson County, Pennsylvania
Unincorporated communities in Pennsylvania